The Our is a river in Belgium, Luxembourg and Germany. It is a left-hand tributary of the river Sauer/Sûre.

The source of the Our is in the High Fens in southeastern Belgium, near Manderfeld. It flows southwards, more or less along the German-Belgian  border, and after Ouren, along the German-Luxembourg border. The historic town of Vianden lies on the Our. The Our empties into the Sauer in Wallendorf.

Course 
The river rises in the eastern Ardennes and western Eifel on Belgian soil. Its source near the village of Losheimergraben lies northeast of the Eichelsberg mountain (653 m) at 643 m near the B 265. Just a few hundred metres away is the source of the River Kyll. The Our initially follows the B 265, which is also the Belgian-German state border. The river continues alternating between Belgium and Germany. From the tripoint by the Europa Monument between Ouren (B), Sevenig (D) and Lieler (L) it runs almost entirely on the German-Luxembourg border until it reaches Wallendorf in Germany where it empties into the Sauer. It flows mainly from north to south but also meanders in places.

For the section where it runs along the German-Luxembourg border the Our is a jointly managed condominium (the "Joint German-Luxembourg Sovereign Area"). Unilateral sovereignty only begins at the respective shore. In its upper reaches between Germany and Belgium, the state border lies, as is normal on the thalweg of the river.

Tributaries 
– Location of the confluences measured from the source of the Our –
 Auw (left, at km 9)
 Ihrenbach (left, at km 21)
 Braunlauf (right, at km 23)
 Irmisch (left, near km 26)
 Ulf (right, near km 30)
 Irsen (left, near km 67)

Length of tributaries over 5 km

A comprehensive list that also includes the smaller tributaries is here.

Villages on the Our 
The border village of Vianden, one of the most important tourist resorts in Luxembourg, lies on the Our. The Our Valley Route is a circular route that runs through Belgium and North Luxembourg. Especially worth seeing is the section between Manderfeld (Belgium) and Lieler (Luxembourg), where the route follows the Our almost all the way. It runs inter alia past Reuland Castle (Ouren) and the Europa Monument at the German-Belgian-Luxembourg tripoint.

Other villages are:

 Roth an der Our
 Ouren
 Sevenig
 Dahnen
 Dasburg
 Rodershausen
 Obereisenbach
 Stolzembourg
 Bettel
 Gentingen
 Ammeldingen an der Our
 Schönberg
 Wallendorf near Bollendorf.
 Grüfflingen near St. Vith
 Auel (village in Burg-Reuland)

Usage 
The Our is impounded north of Vianden by the Our Dam and forms the lower basin of the Vianden Pumped Storage Plant.

See also 
 Our Natural Park

References

Literature 
 Leonard Palzkill: Ourtal ohne Grenzen. Neuerburg, 2006, .

External links 

 
 Official home page of the Our Nature Park with information  on tourism, the ecology and local events for North Luxembourg
 
 Ensebach - Upper Our Nature Reserve
 Hochwassermeldezentrum The Moselle in Trier

International rivers of Europe
Belgium–Germany border
Germany–Luxembourg border
Rivers of the Ardennes (Belgium)
Rivers of the Ardennes (Luxembourg)
Rivers of Rhineland-Palatinate
Rivers of Belgium
Rivers of Luxembourg
Rivers of Wallonia
Rivers of Liège Province
Rivers of Luxembourg (Belgium)
Büllingen
Vianden
Rivers of the Eifel
Rivers of Germany
Border rivers